York Plateau is located on the Seward Peninsula of the U.S. state of Alaska. It is situated beyond the western front of the York Mountains. The top of the plateau is smooth and hard. The larger streams within the plateau have rather broad valleys, which are cut down nearly to sea level, while the smaller tributaries flow in canyons. To the south, the plateau ends in a steep escarpment which is separated from the Bering Sea by a narrow coastal plain or beach. The plateau seems to slope more gradually to the Arctic Ocean, from which it is separated by a coastal plain which extends inland for several miles. A wide lagoon separates this coastal plain from the Arctic Ocean. The surface of the plateau is covered with a thin layer of semiangular gravels.

References

Landforms of Nome Census Area, Alaska
Plateaus of the United States
Landforms of the Seward Peninsula